Metcalfe's law states that the value of a telecommunications network is proportional to the square of the number of connected users
of the system (n2). First formulated in this form by George Gilder in 1993, and attributed to Robert Metcalfe in regard to Ethernet, Metcalfe's law was originally presented, c. 1980, not in terms of users, but rather of "compatible communicating devices" (e.g., fax machines, telephones). Only later with the globalization of the Internet did this law carry over to users and networks as its original intent was to describe Ethernet  connections.

Network effects
Metcalfe's law characterizes many of the network effects of communication technologies and networks such as the Internet, social networking and the World Wide Web. Former Chairman of the U.S. Federal Communications Commission Reed Hundt said that this law gives the most understanding to the workings of the Internet.

The law has often been illustrated using the example of fax machines: a single fax machine is useless, but the value of every fax machine increases with the total number of fax machines in the network, because the total number of people with whom each user may send and receive documents increases. Likewise, in  social networks, the greater the number of users with the service, the more valuable the service becomes to the community.

History and derivation 
Metcalfe’s law was conceived in 1983 in a presentation to the 3Com sales force.  It stated V would be proportional to the total number of possible connections, or approximately n-squared.

The original incarnation was careful to delineate between a linear cost (Cn), non-linear growth, n2, and a non-constant proportionality factor A “Affinity.”  The breakeven point where costs are recouped is given by

At some size, the right-hand side of the equation V “Value” exceeds the cost, and A describes the relationship between size and net value added.  For large n, net network value is then

Metcalfe properly dimensioned A as “value per user”. Affinity is also a function of network size, and Metcalfe correctly asserted that A must decline as n grows large.  In a 2006 interview, Metcalfe stated

There may be diseconomies of network scale that eventually drive values down with increasing size. So, if V=A*n2, it could be that A (for “affinity,” value per connection) is also a function of n and heads down after some network size, overwhelming n2.

Growth of n 
Network size, and hence value, does not grow unbounded but is constrained by practical limitations such as infrastructure, access to technology, and bounded rationality such as Dunbar's number. It is almost always the case that user growth n reaches a saturation point.  With technologies, substitutes, competitors and technical obsolescence constrain growth of n.  Growth of n is typically assumed to follow a sigmoid function such as a logistic curve or Gompertz curve.

Density 
A is also governed by the connectivity or density of the network topology. In an undirected network, every edge connects two nodes such that there are 2m nodes per edge.

Therefore the density ρ of a network is the faction of those edges that are actually present is

Limitations 
Metcalfe’s law assumes that the value of each node  is of equal benefit. If this is not the case, for example because one fax machine serves 60 workers in a company, the second fax machine serves half of that, the third one third, and so on, then the relative value of an additional connection decreases. Likewise, in social networks, if users that join later use the network less than early adopters, then the benefit of each additional user may lessen, making the overall network less efficient if costs per users are fixed.

Modified models
Reed and Andrew Odlyzko have sought out possible relationships to Metcalfe's Law in terms of describing the relationship of a network and one can read about how those are related. Tongia and Wilson also examine the related question of the costs to those excluded.

Validation in data 
Despite many arguments about Metcalfe' law, no real data based evidence for or against was available for more than 30 years. A few months later, Metcalfe himself provided further proof, as he used Facebook's data over the past 10 years to show a good fit for Metcalfe's law (the model is ).

In 2015, Zhang, Liu and Xu parameterized the Metcalfe function in data from Tencent and Facebook. Their work showed that Metcalfe's law held for both, despite differences in audience between the two sites (Facebook serving a worldwide audience and Tencent serving only Chinese users).

In a working paper, Peterson linked time-value-of-money concepts to Metcalfe value using Bitcoin and Facebook as numerical examples of the proof and in 2018 applied Metcalfe's law to Bitcoin, showing that over 70% of variance in Bitcoin value was explained by applying Metcalfe's law to increases in Bitcoin network size.

See also 
 Anti-rival good
 Beckstrom's law
 List of eponymous laws
 Matching (graph theory)
 Matthew effect
 Pareto principle
 Reed's law
 Sarnoff's law

References

Further reading

.

External links 
 A Group Is Its Own Worst Enemy. Clay Shirky's keynote speech on Social Software at the O'Reilly Emerging Technology conference, Santa Clara, April 24, 2003. The fourth of his "Four Things to Design For" is: "And, finally, you have to find a way to spare the group from scale. Scale alone kills conversations, because conversations require dense two-way conversations. In conversational contexts, Metcalfe's law is a drag."

Computer architecture statements
Economics laws
Eponyms
Information theory